Nasser Al Esawi (born 27 January 1975) is an Iraqi politician, currently Minister of Industry & Minerals, was born 27 January 1975 in Najaf, Iraq.

Specialized certificates
 Bachelor of Arts – English Language \ University of Kufa.
 Master of Law – University of Kufa.

Career progression
 Member Teachers Syndicate.
 Member Bar Association.
 Member Iraqi Parliament of the First Session 2006–2011.
 Member Iraqi Council of Representatives Third parliamentary session.
 Member Committee of civil society organizations for the first parliamentary session.

References

External links
 Official website(Ministry of Industry and Minerals)

1975 births
People from Najaf
Living people
Government ministers of Iraq